Symphyotrichum grandiflorum (formerly Aster grandiflorus), the largeflower aster, is a species of flowering plant in the family Asteraceae. It is endemic to the southeastern United States where it is restricted to the Atlantic coastal plain of Virginia, North Carolina, and South Carolina, and the Piedmont of North Carolina and South Carolina. It is known from habitats such as sandy areas, roadsides, thickets, and forest edges. It can be distinguished from other Symphyotrichum species by its taller and hairier stems, clasping lower leaves, and large, showy flower heads. It is possibly threatened by habitat destruction within its restricted range but is still considered locally abundant in many areas such as the southern Appalachian Mountains.

Gallery

Citations

References

grandiflorum
Endemic flora of the United States
Flora of the Southeastern United States
Plants described in 1753
Taxa named by Carl Linnaeus